Swainsonia newcombii , common name Newcomb's mitre, is a species of sea snail, a marine gastropod mollusk in the family Mitridae, the miters or miter snails.

Description
The length of the shell varies between 20 mm and 41 mm.

Distribution
This marine species occurs off Hawaii, Midway, New Caledonia and Tanzania.

References

 Poppe G.T. & Tagaro S.P. (2008). Mitridae. pp. 330–417, in: G.T. Poppe (ed.), Philippine marine mollusks, volume 2. Hackenheim: ConchBooks. 848 pp.
 Le Beon R., 2014, 2013. - Revision of the taxon Scabricola newcombii (Pease, 1869). Description of a new taxon: Scabricola newcombii irisae n. ssp. from New Caledonia and the Philippines. Xenophora Taxonomy 2: 30-33

External links
 
 Pease W. H. (1869). Description of new species of marine Gasteropodæ inhabiting Polynesia. American Journal of Conchology. 5: 64-79
 Fedosov A., Puillandre N., Herrmann M., Kantor Yu., Oliverio M., Dgebuadze P., Modica M.V. & Bouchet P. (2018). The collapse of Mitra: molecular systematics and morphology of the Mitridae (Gastropoda: Neogastropoda). Zoological Journal of the Linnean Society. 183(2): 253-337

Mitridae
Gastropods described in 1869